Gregory Blair is an American actor, director, and playwright. Blair has portrayed fall guys, villains and characters in between. He received a Geoffrey Award for Best Character Actor for his role in Sylvia, a Stonewall Award for his novel Spewing Pulp, and an EOTM Award for "Best Director of an Indie Horror Film" for Deadly Revisions. Blair studied in and around Southern California, including at UCLA.

Career
Blair performed in the plays Sylvia, Working, and Six Degrees of Separation, in the films On The Rocks, Ooga Booga, and Garden Party Massacre, and in Escape The Night, Love That Girl!, Alternate History on TV.

Blair wrote the plays Cold Lang Syne, The Last Banana and Nicholas Nickleby. He published the Stonewall Award-winning book Spewing Pulp). Blair has written over a dozen screenplays and a first place in the Horror Screenplay Contest and "Best Screenplay" in the Fantastic Horror Film Festival. Current screenplays sold and/or in production include "Garden Party Massacre", "Heretiks" and Deadly Revisions—which Blair also directed and helped produce.

Film festival awards
Best Director of an Indie Horror Film (Deadly Revisions) – EOTM Awards
Best Picture (Deadly Revisions) – Matchflick.com Flicker Awards
Best Narrative Feature (Deadly Revisions) – Los Angeles Film Awards
Best Screenplay (Deadly Revisions) – Terror Film Festival
Best Feature "Garden Party Massacre" – Fantastic Horror Film Festival 
Best Screenplay "Garden Party Massacre" – Fantastic Horror Film Festival 
Outstanding Horror/Comedy Feature" "Garden Party Massacre") – Los Angeles Academy of Film Awards

Filmography
Film

Television

Publications
 Spewing Pulp (Infinity Publishing, 2004) 
 "Who cares if gays marry?" in W. Royce Adams: Viewpoints'' (Cengage Learning, 2009)

References

External links
 
 Gregory Blair on IMDb

American male stage actors
American male film actors
American male television actors
American male voice actors
Living people
Male actors from Los Angeles
University of California, Los Angeles alumni

21st-century American dramatists and playwrights
Writers from Los Angeles
Year of birth missing (living people)